Betzy Bromberg is an American director, editor, and experimental filmmaker. She is the Director of the Program in Film and Video at California Institute of the Arts. Her work has been shown at the Rotterdam, London, Edinburgh, Sundance and Vancouver Film Festivals as well as the Museum of Modern Art (New York City), Museum of Fine Arts, Boston, the San Francisco Cinematheque, the Harvard Film Archive (Cambridge), Anthology Film Archives (New York City), the National Film Theater (London), The Vootrum Centrum (Belgium) and the Centre Georges Pompidou (France).

Bromberg studied at CalArts in the late 1970s with Chick Strand, and for many years was an optical effects supervisor in the special effects industry.

Background 
Bromberg originally studied journalism and photography at Northwestern University before she became a filmmaker. Bromberg started making her first films at Sarah Lawrence College in 1977, where she studied both film and electronic music. After she graduated from college, Betzy Bromberg relocated to Los Angeles and studied at CalArts under Chick Strand. Later, she spent over twenty years working in the Hollywood industry as an optical effects camerawoman and supervisor. She began teaching in 1990 and in 2002, she became the Director of the Program in Film and Video at CalArts after the industry abandoned analog effects and moved much production overseas.

Style 
Bromberg's earlier films were influenced by New York, where she spent was born and raised, and spent part of her college career. She is known for her experimental avant-garde stylistic approach in cinema. In many of her works she experiments with the intersection of documentary and avant-garde.

Bromberg's work in the Hollywood industry of optical effects allowed her to carry over technical and problem solving skills to her experimental work without detriment to its avant-garde themes. Additionally, her experimental film works have all been shot in 16mm, an analog medium which Bromberg says she will work with until "either I'm done or it's done," in reference to the dominance of digital filmmaking in Hollywood.

The style of Bromberg's experimental films is described as slowly evolving into the abstract, consciously free of the special effects of her industry career, and evocative of "a retrieval of a kind of visual innocence." Bromberg's use of light and the transformation of the movement of light over time is the basis of her filmmaking and can be seen throughout her works.

Directorial filmography

Recognition 
2011 Voluptuous Sleep

 premiered at the 2011 New York Film Festival: Views From The Avant-Garde. 
 listed as one of the Best Films for 2011 in both the New York Times and Indiewire. 
 Awarded the Stan Brakhage award at the 50th Ann Arbor Film Festival.
 Screened at the Bradford International Film Festival in the United Kingdom.
 Premiered at the Buenos Aires Festival Internacional de Cine Independiente, BAFICI in 2012. 
 Premiered at Buenos Aires International Festival of

2005 a Darkness Swallowed

 Premiered at the 2006 Sundance Film Festival.
 Screened at Seoul Independent Film Festival in South Korea.
 Screened at the Athens International Film Festival in Greece.
 Screened at the Bradford International Film Festival in the United Kingdom.
 Screened at the Seattle International Film Festival in Washington.
Screened at Buenos Aires International Festival of Independent Cinema, BAFICI in 2007 as part of a Retrospective of Bromberg's films.

References

External links
 

American experimental filmmakers
Living people
California Institute of the Arts alumni
California Institute of the Arts faculty
Year of birth missing (living people)